Victor de Padua (1898–1952) was Provincial Governor of the province of Batanes right after the Japanese occupation of the Philippines. A member of the Ilocano people, he had previously been a school superintendent.

De Padua was an Ilocano by birth. Originally Victor Padua, after a family dispute, he went to Batanes after high school to work as an English teacher, and eventually settled in the island changing his name to Victor DE Padua. He was sent to the Philippine Normal School as a pensionado, and on his return to Batanes became Head Teacher, and eventually became the first Division Superintendent of Schools for Batanes. During World War II  the Japanese executed the erstwhile governor Juan Agudo, and after the liberation of the Philippines by the Americans, the Provincial Board of Batanes prevailed upon him to serve as interim governor for Batanes. After a few months as governor, he relinquished the position as governor to resume his original appointment as Division Superintendent for Schools. He reopened the public school system. He died in 1952 at the age of 54. He was married to Rosario Baroña; they had six children, who became professionals. Four graduated from University of the Philippines Manila, College of Medicine as MDs, and 2 became professional civil engineers, one from Mapua Institute of Technology in Manila and one from University of the Philippines Diliman, College of Engineering.

His descendants now live in the United States, Australia, Manila and Los Baños, Laguna in the Philippines.

References

1898 births
1952 deaths
Governors of Batanes
Ilocano people
Filipino educators
20th-century Filipino politicians
Philippine Normal University alumni